Kaliaganj Assembly constituency is an assembly constituency in Uttar Dinajpur district in the Indian state of West Bengal. It is reserved for scheduled castes.

Overview
As per orders of the Delimitation Commission, No. 34 Kaliaganj Assembly constituency (SC) covers Kaliaganj municipality, Kaliaganj community development block and Barua and Birghai gram panchayats of Raiganj community development block.

Kaliaganj Assembly constituency is part of No. 5 Raiganj (Lok Sabha constituency). It was earlier part of Balurghat (Lok Sabha constituency).

Members of Legislative Assembly

Election results

2021
In the 2021 election, Soumen Roy of BJP defeated his nearest rival Tapan Deb Singha of Trinamool Congress.

2019 bye-poll
A bye-poll was necessitated due to the death of the incumbent MLA, Pramatha Nath Ray. In this election, Tapan Deb Singha of Trinamool Congress defeated his nearest rival Kamal Chandra Sarkar of BJP.

2016
In the 2016 election, Pramatha Nath Ray of Indian National Congress defeated his nearest rival Basanta Roy of Trinamool Congress.

2011
In the 2011 election, Pramatha Nath Ray of Congress defeated his nearest rival Nani Gopal Roy of CPI(M).

 

.# Swing calculated on Congress+Trinamool Congress vote percentages taken together in 2006.

1977–2006
In the 2006 state assembly elections, Nani Gopal Roy of CPI(M) won the Kaliaganj (SC) assembly seat defeating his nearest rival Pramatha Nath Ray of Congress. Contests in most years were multi cornered but only winners and runners are being mentioned. Pramathanath Ray of Congress defeated Ramani Kanta Debsarma of CPI(M) in 2001 and 1996. Ramani Kanta Debsarma of CPI(M) defeated Pramatha Nath Roy of Congress in 1991 and Naba Kumar Roy of Congress in 1987. Naba Kumar Roy of Congress defeated Nani Gopal Roy of CPI(M) in 1982 and 1977.

1962–1972
Debendra Nath Roy of Congress won in 1972 and 1971. Syama Prasad Barman won the Kaliaganj seat in 1969, 1967 and 1962. Prior to that the Kaliaganj seat was not there. In 1957 and 1951 Raiganj was a joint seat. Hazi Badirudddin Ahmad and Syama Prasad Barman, both of Congress, won from Raiganj in 1957. Syama Prasad Barman and Gulam Hamidur Rahman, both of Congress, won from Raiganj in 1951.

References

Assembly constituencies of West Bengal
Politics of Uttar Dinajpur district